Gonbad is a village in Dizajrud-e Sharqi Rural District, Qaleh Chay District, Ajab Shir County, East Azerbaijan Province, Iran. At the 2006 census, its population was 301, in 77 families.

References 

Populated places in Ajab Shir County